Rupa Sarkar is the Editor-in-Chief of The Lancet Digital Health, a gold open access medical journal in the Lancet family published by Elsevier.

She conducted her doctoral research at Imperial College London, where she studied RNA biology and its role in human stem cell differentiation. After earning her PhD, she did postdoctoral research at the Albert Einstein College of Medicine, then worked as an associate editor at Nature Protocols, a senior editor at Genome Biology, and Chief Editor at Nature Protocols. She has been Editor-in-Chief at The Lancet Digital Health since its founding in 2018.

References

Living people
Year of birth missing (living people)
Alumni of Imperial College London